Lead white is a white pigment composed primarily of basic lead carbonate, .  It was the most widely used white pigment from antiquity until the nineteenth century, when it was displaced by zinc white. In addition to being used independently, lead white is frequently used to produce tints of other colors. In combination with blue, it appears often in depictions of the sky, and it is commonly used with red and brown pigments to create flesh tones. Most art supply companies now explicitly advise against the use of lead white because of the risk that it poses of lead poisoning.

Production methods 
A common production method in antiquity involved placing lead shavings above vinegar, allowing the acidic vapors to react with the lead. In 17th-century Holland, an alternative process was devised that involved placing lead above vinegar, then sealing them in a room full of horse manure, which served as a source of both heat and carbon dioxide.

Notable occurrences 
The ubiquity of lead white for much of recorded history makes its occurrences in art widespread. Several examples, significant for their early date, are Fayum portraits from the second century CE. Lead white can be found in paintings well into the 20th century, including in the work of major artists such as Picasso.

References 

Inorganic pigments
Pigments
Shades of white